WLDI (95.5 FM) is a radio station licensed to Juno Beach, Florida and broadcasting in the Treasure Coast and West Palm Beach, Florida markets. The station airs a Top 40 (CHR) format. It is owned by iHeartMedia, and broadcasts at 95.5 FM.  Its studios are in West Palm Beach and its transmitter is located west of Interstate 95 near Palm City, Florida. The station broadcasts in an HD radio format, originally having LGBT hits and dance station Pride Radio on its HD2 subchannel. WLDI eventually dropped Pride Radio for Gen X Radio, broadcasting a classic hits format from the 1970s - 1980s. It later dropped that for commercial-free R&B station All My Jams, before it started simulcasting sister station WJNO on its HD2 subchannel in 2021.

Timeline

as WOVV
Before its move to West Palm Beach, WOVV was one of the first FM outlets on the Treasure Coast and operated beside WIRA in Fort Pierce, Florida. For many years, both stations broadcast from a downtown riverfront location on Melody Lane.
In the late 60s, WIRA-FM separated programming from WIRA to become WOVV and in 1971 the station's Top 40 music era began when the station adopted an automated contemporary format from Drake-Chenault known as "Solid Gold Rock and Roll."  At that time solid gold did not refer to exclusively oldies but was instead a fairly even mix of oldies and contemporary Top 40 hits. A year later in 1972, the station began 24-hour operations and also began featuring progressive rock music at night. This lasted for a few years until being dropped by the end of the decade.

December 1985: -- Program Director Bill James is replaced by Bobby Magic from Cleveland as station ends four years of "live assist automation."  Linda Hendry moved from evenings to midday, replaced in that slot by Mike Schneider.  Dr. John Leeder left to manage a Port St. Lucie video store, and was replaced by Nick Caplan of Buffalo, New York.

July 1987: -- WZZR joins the Ft. Pierce market after dropping Easy Listening music for Contemporary Hit Radio.

1989: -- Jon Howe and Kris Klaus host the Breakfast Club show.

as Star 95.5
October 1992 -- WOVV drops CHR music and becomes an AC station called Star 95.5.

February 1993 -- Station moved 60 miles south from Ft. Pierce to Northpoint Corporate Park on Northpoint Parkway in West Palm Beach.  New Program Director Kurt Kelly gave the Palm Beach Post his home telephone number and invited listeners to call to comment on their likes and dislikes of the station's format.

1993:  --  M.J. Kelli and Robin Lambert take over morning show from Jon Howe and Kris Klaus.  Klaus becomes a weekend weather person for WPBF Channel 25.  Howe returns within months to do midday and later afternoons.

April 1993: -- Program director Kurt Kelly is gone after barely four months. WOVV management said Kelly was let go because his vision of a regional super station did not fit its signal strength and Palm Beach County listener base.  The station becomes a CHR station again.

March 17, 1994: --  Neil Sullivan of WKDD in Akron, Ohio is named Program Director. He replaces M.J. Kelli, who left for Tampa.  Kelli also hosted the morning show.

April 23, 1994: -- Lindy Rome from oldies WOLL-FM and Lane London from England host what station boss Steve Lapa says is the area's first all-female morning drive show. ``Lindy will be doing some things she never dreamed she was capable of, Lapa added. ``But we're known for doing wild things.  Rome was fired after three months.

As WCLB
November 22, 1995 at 4:40 p.m. -- Station abruptly becomes Country WCLB (the Country Club) with Alan Jackson's "Gone Country" as the first song, after signing a joint sales agreement with Fairbanks Communications, the owners of WRMF.

The station ran the syndicated Howard Stern Show in the morning from September 1996 until December 1997.

The station was briefly known as country "The Frog" and "Thunder Country" with call letters WXFG in 1998.

As WiLD 95-5/WLDI
The station dropped Country and returned to Mainstream CHR as WiLD 95.5 (with new call letters WLDI) on August 14, 1998 shortly after 5 p.m., with a 9,550 song marathon.  The first song was Quad City DJ's' "C'mon N' Ride It (The Train)".  The station gave away a $25,000 cash prize at the conclusion of the music marathon. The station was the birthplace and the home of the successful morning show The KVJ Show (originally known as Kevin and Virginia in the Morning and later The Wild Morning Show with Kevin and Virginia, from 1999 until its departure to 97.3 The Coast (now known as Hits 97.3) in Miami on Monday August 5, 2013.

References

External links
Official website

LDI
Contemporary hit radio stations in the United States
Radio stations established in 1961
IHeartMedia radio stations
1961 establishments in Florida